New Silk Route Partners LLC, abb as NSR,  is a $1.4-billion private equity firm that invests in private companies in India, Asia, and the Middle East.

History 

New Silk Route was initially named Taj Capital. Its founding team included, at various points (alphabetically):

 Abdul Hafeez Shaikh, 20th finance minister of Pakistan
 Anil Kumar, former senior partner at McKinsey & Company
 Mark Schwartz, former chairman of Goldman Sachs Asia and CEO of Soros Fund Management
 Parag Saxena, former managing partner of Invesco Capital and Vedanta Capital
 Raj Rajaratnam, former managing partner of the Galleon Group
 Victor Menezes, former vice chairman of Citigroup

Messrs. Kumar, Rajaratnam, and Schwartz resigned as founding partners before the firm began operation.

The firm enjoyed close relationships with both Goldman Sachs and the Galleon Group: "A month before joining Goldman’s board, Rajat Gupta began marketing a $2 billion hybrid private-equity and hedge fund vehicle called Taj Capital Partners with one of Goldman’s biggest hedge fund clients, Raj Rajaratnam." According to Fortune, "New Silk Route's original fundraising was for $2 billion (under the name Taj Capital) -- and [...] the first $600 million or so went into Galleon hedge funds."

Leadership Team 
 Anand Dorairaj, Partner
 Jacob Kurian, Partner
 Jens Yahya Zimmerman, Partner
 Parag Saxena, CEO & Founding General Partner
 Sanjeev Chachondia, Operating Partner
 Vivek Sett, Partner

Senior Operating Partners 

The fund formed a strategic advisory board in January 2012 comprising:
 Dr. Herbert Henzler, former Senior Partner and Chairman of Europe at McKinsey & Company
 Nina Shapiro, VP Finance at International Finance Corporation
 Supratim Bose, President of Asia-Pacific at Boston Scientific and former Partner at New Silk Route

Investments 
In 2007:
 Reliance Telecom Infrastructure
 Ascend Telecom

In 2008:
 Augere
 Beaconhouse School System
 Destimoney
 Orissa Television Communications

In 2010 NSR:
 Café Coffee Day
 Nectar Lifesciences
 Amonix

In 2013:
 Moshes Fine Foods 

It had large stakes in 9X Media and Ascend Telecom Infrastructure as of 2016. Its other investments include VRL Logistics, Rolex Rings, KS Oils, Varsity Education Management and Vasudev Adiga’s Fast Food.

References

Further reading 
 FT Tilt
 Cafe Coffee Day
 Saxena interview

External links
 NSR official website

Private equity firms